Charles A. Doswell III (born November 5, 1945) is an American meteorologist and prolific severe convective storms researcher. Doswell is a seminal contributor, along with Leslie R. Lemon, to the modern conception of the supercell, which was developed originally by Keith Browning. He also has done research on forecasting and forecast verification, especially for severe convective storms, and is an advocate of ingredients-based forecasting.

Doswell was an early storm chaser; in fact, among the first scientific storm chasers, and still actively chases recreationally. He was a forecaster for the first project VORTEX in 1994/1995 and has produced more than 100 refereed publications and several contributions to books and encyclopedias. He edited the American Meteorological Society Monograph Severe Convective Storms as well as coauthored two papers therein.

Doswell is a semiprofessional photographer, with a special emphasis on storm photographs and also is a Certified Consulting Meteorologist (CCM). Doswell hosts the blues program Juke Joint and co-hosts with Gene Rhoden the severe storms program High Instability on the ShockNet internet radio station.

References

External links 
 CIMMS website
 Personal website and blog
 C. Doswell Enterprises
 

American meteorologists
University of Wisconsin–Madison alumni
University of Oklahoma alumni
Storm chasers
1945 births
Living people
National Weather Service people